The 1989 USC Trojans football team represented the University of Southern California during the 1989 NCAA Division I-A football season. The season was intended to start historic fashion, with USC set to play Illinois in Moscow in what was dubbed the Glasnost Bowl.  However, the plan to play the game at Dynamo Stadium fell through, and the game was rescheduled at Memorial Coliseum.  The Trojans lost the game as the Illini scored two touchdowns in the fourth quarter.

USC won their third consecutive conference championship and gained their 600th program win in a victory against Oregon State.  They played third-ranked Michigan in the Rose Bowl and won giving Larry Smith his only bowl victory as head coach.

Schedule

Personnel

Rankings

Season summary

Illinois

Utah State

Ohio State

at Washington State

Source:

Washington

at California

at Notre Dame

Pregame fight in tunnel

Stanford

Oregon State

at Arizona

UCLA

vs. Michigan (Rose Bowl)

    
    
    
    
    

The Trojans avenged last season's loss to Michigan in the Rose Bowl, beating the Wolverines in Bo Schembechler's last game as head coach.

Team players drafted into the NFL
The following players were claimed in the 1990 NFL Draft.

References

USC
USC Trojans football seasons
Pac-12 Conference football champion seasons
Rose Bowl champion seasons
USC Trojans football